Roman Rozna (born 25 March 1976 in Grigoriopol, Moldavian SSR) is a male hammer thrower from Moldova. His personal best throw is 76.62 metres, achieved in June 2003 in Minsk.

He finished twelfth at the 2001 Summer Universiade and seventh at the 2003 Summer Universiade. He also competed at the 2005 World Championships, the 2006 European Championships as well as the Olympic Games in 2000, 2004 and 2008 without reaching the final.

Achievements

References

1976 births
Living people
People from Grigoriopol
Moldovan male hammer throwers
Athletes (track and field) at the 2000 Summer Olympics
Athletes (track and field) at the 2004 Summer Olympics
Athletes (track and field) at the 2008 Summer Olympics
Olympic athletes of Moldova
World Athletics Championships athletes for Moldova